, formerly  is a Japanese media conglomerate that was created as a result of the merger of the original Kadokawa Corporation and Dwango Co., Ltd. on October 1, 2014.

History 
The holding company known today as Kadokawa Corporation was originally founded in 1945 as Kadokawa Shoten, to "revitalize Japanese culture through publishing" in the postwar era. It was merged with Dwango Co., Ltd. to form Kadokawa Dwango on October 1, 2014, and became a subsidiary of Kadokawa Dwango.

In February 2019, Kadokawa Dwango announced that Dwango would stop being their subsidiary to be a direct subsidiary of Kadokawa Corporation in a reorganization of the company. This made Kadokawa Corporation the sole subsidiary of the holding company Kadokawa Dwango.

On July 1, 2019, Kadokawa Dwango was reorganized again; only the publishing business remained in Kadokawa Corporation, and it was renamed Kadokawa Future Publishing, while Kadokawa Dwango itself became the second iteration of Kadokawa Corporation and the holding company of all of the Kadokawa Group companies. The original name Kadokawa Shoten remains as a brand and a division of Kadokawa Future Publishing.

On February 4, 2021, Kadokawa announced that the company had formed a Capital Alliance with Sony and CyberAgent to strengthen the company's creation, development, and acquisition of new IP while also maximizing use of existing IPs. As part of the agreement both Sony and CyberAgent would each receive a 1.93% stake in the company via American investment company of Japanese subsidiary, KKR Japan acquired a 12% stake.

On October 29, 2021, Kadokawa announced that it had formed a capital and business alliance with Tencent, which acquired a 6.86% stake in the conglomerate for ¥30 billion ($264 million). The aim of the alliance is for Kadokawa to expand its global reach using Tencent's platforms. China, where the company has an existing joint venture with Tencent, is a particular target.

Controversy 
In September 2022 chairman Tsuguhiko Kadokawa—son of founder Genyoshi—was arrested as part of a police investigation into bribery. Prosecutors alleged that the Kadokawa chairman authorized a ¥76 million payment(adjusted to ¥69 million under Japan's statute of limitations) to a consulting company with ties to a former executive of the Tokyo Olympics organizing committee  in exchange for being selected as an official sponsor of the 2020 Tokyo Olympic and Paralympic Games.  Kadokawa has denied the allegations, and his company announced that it would cooperate with the investigation.

Kadokawa was indicted by prosecutors on October 4, 2022. Later that day he announced his intent to resign as the chairman of his company. He continued to deny the allegations and vowed to prove his innocence at trial.

Group companies 
Kadokawa Corporation serves to bring together several affiliated Japanese companies related to Kadokawa Shoten under what is known as the Kadokawa Group. These companies are of three types: publishing, film and visuals, and cross media. The publishers primarily deal with books, bunkobon paperbacks, manga, and visual media magazines; the film and visual companies deal with Japanese feature films and DVD sales of international films and anime; the cross media companies deal with digital content, urban information and television program information magazines, along with information transmission combining paper media, the Internet, and mobile phones. Other aspects of the group are handled by the other business segment which primarily takes care of video games, real estate leasing, and comprises an advertising agency.

Publication 
 BookWalker
 GeeXPlus, Inc
 Trista
 Choubunsha Publishing Co.
 Comic Walker
 eb Creative
 Japan Digital Library Service
 Kadokawa ASCII Research Laboratories
 Kadokawa Book Navi
 Kadokawa Future Publishing
 ASCII Media Works
 Building Book Center
 Chukei Publishing 
 Enterbrain
 Fujimi Shobo
 Kadokawa Gakugei Publishing
 Kadokawa Key-Process 
 Kadokawa Magazines
 Kadokawa Shoten
 Media Factory
 Kadokawa Game Linkage
 Kadokawa Uplink
 Mainichi GA Hakken
 Production Ace

Group media 
 Dwango
 Dehogallery
 Dwango AG Entertainment
 Dwango Music Publishing
 FromNetworks
 Niconico
 Project Studio Q
 Spike Chunsoft
 Vaka
 Vantan
 Virtual Cast Co., Ltd.
 Watanabe Amaduction
 Docomo Anime Store
 K.Sense (80%)
 Kadokawa Media House
 Kadokawa Uplink
 Kids Net
 Movie Walker
 Movie Ticket
 T Gate
 Smile Edge

Films and visuals 
 ENGI (53%)
 EuropaCorp Japan
 Glovision
 Japan Film Fund 
 Kadokawa Anime
 Kadokawa Architecture
 Kadokawa Daiei Studio
 Globalgate Entertainment
 Kinema Citrus (31.8%)
 Nihon Eiga Satellite Broadcasting
 Movie Walker
 Persol Media Switch (30%)
 Studio Kadan

Others 
 ATX
 Chara-Ani Corporation
 Customcast
 C・P・S
 FromSoftware (69.66%, co-owned with Tencent and Sony)
 Gotcha Gotcha Games 
 Kadokawa ASCII Research Laboratories
 Cool Japan Travel, Inc. (75%)
 Kadokawa Architecture
 Kadokawa Contents Academy
 Kadokawa Connected
 Kadokawa Craft
 Kadokawa Games
 K’s Lab
 Karksa Media Partner Corporation (34%)
 Page Turner
 Production Ace
 Tokorozawa Sakuratown Corporation

Overseas 
 Animate Oversea (joint venture under Kadokawa Taiwan with Animate and United Distribution Co.)
 Bookwalker Taiwan
 Guangzhou Tianwen Kadokawa Animation and Comics
 Hemisphere Motion Picture Partners I
 Hemisphere Motion Picture Partners II
 Japan Manga Alliance (joint venture with Animate, Kodansha, Shueisha and Shogakukan
 Animate JMA (Thailand)
 J-Novel Club
 Kadokawa Amarin (joint venture with Amarin Group, marketed under the brand Phoenix Next)
 Kadokawa Contents Academy
 Kadokawa Hong Kong
 Kadokawa Holdings Asia
 J-Guide Marketing
 Kadokawa Gempak Starz (Malaysia) (80%)
 Kadokawa Holdings US
 Kadokawa International Edutainment (Taiwan)
 Kadokawa Pictures America
 Kadokawa Taiwan Corporation
 Kadokawa Consulting (Thailand)
 Kadokawa Qingyu (Shanghai) Culture & Creation
 Kadokawa World Entertainment (US)
 Anime News Network (majority interest, co-owned with Bandai Namco Filmworks and Christopher Macdonald, pending)
 Sun Wah Kadokawa (Hong Kong) Group
 Taiwan Animate
 Yen Press (51%, co-owned with Hachette Book Group)

Former subsidiaries 
 Asmik Ace
 Daihyakka News: Merged with Dwango in July 2019.
 Kadokawa Entertainment: On November 1, 2009, Kadokawa Entertainment was merged into Kadokawa Pictures.
 Kadokawa Group Publishing: On April 1, 2013, Kadokawa Group Publishing was merged into Kadokawa Group Holdings.
 Kadokawa J:COM Media: Established in November 2005 as a joint venture between Kadokawa Shoten and J:COM. It was eliminated in June 2010.
 So-net Kadokawa Link: Established on June 27, 2007, with So-net Entertainment (43.5%), Kadokawa Mobile (43.5%), and Dentsu E-link (13.0%).
 Kadokawa Mobile and Movie Gate: On October 1, 2009, Kadokawa Mobile merged with Movie Gate to form Kadokawa Contents Gate.
 Kadokawa Production: On October 1, 2013, the company was dissolved and integrated in Kadokawa Corporation.
 Mages: On July 12, 2019, Mages was acquired by Chiyomaru Studio, a concept and copyright company also headed by Mages CEO.
 MediaLeaves: On January 10, 2010, MediaLeaves was merged into Enterbrain.
 NTT Prime Square: On November 30, 2010, Fan service endedm joint venture with NTT.
 Sarugakucho: Became part of Kadokawa Group Holdings under Enterbrain during the ASCII acquisition. On March 31, 2010, Pole To Win announced that it has acquired Sarugakucho.
 Studio Lide: Closed in April 2019.
 Words Gear: On September 26, 2006, Panasonic announced the establishment of Words Gear with Kadokawa Mobile and Tokyo Broadcasting System, effective on October 2, 2006. On September 30, 2010, Kadokawa Group Holdings announced merging Words Gear into Kadokawa Contents Gate, with Kadokawa Contents Gate as the surviving company, effective on January 1, 2011.

See also 
 ASCII Media Works - They split from Kadokawa, but became a subsidiary of Kadokawa again.

References

External links 
 

 
 
Comic book publishing companies in Tokyo
Companies listed on the Tokyo Stock Exchange
Entertainment companies established in 1945
Holding companies based in Tokyo
Holding companies established in 2014
Japanese brands
Japanese companies established in 1945
Japanese companies established in 2014
Liberal media in Japan
Magazine publishing companies in Tokyo
Mass media companies of Japan
Mass media companies established in 1945
Multinational companies headquartered in Japan
Multinational publishing companies
Publishing companies established in 1945
Publishing companies established in 2014